Yuto Kishina (born October 15, 2001) is a Japanese figure skater. He is the 2020 Bavarian Open bronze medalist.

Early life 
Yuto Kishina was born on October 15, 2001, in Asakuchi, Okayama, Japan. He began skating in 2007.

Career

2018–19 season: First JGP medal 
Kishina opened his season in September 2018 at the Junior Grand Prix event in Lithuania, where he earned a bronze medal. He then placed ninth at his second event in Armenia.

2020–21 season 
Kishina was assigned to compete at the 2020 NHK Trophy.

Programs

Competitive highlights 
GP: Grand Prix; JGP: Junior Grand Prix

Detailed results 

 ISU personal bests highlighted in bold.

References 

2001 births
Living people
Japanese male single skaters
Sportspeople from Okayama Prefecture